General elections were held in Tokelau between 23 and 31 January 2017.

Electoral system
The 21 members of Parliament were elected from three seven-seat constituencies corresponding to the three villages on the island, Atafu, Fakaofo and Nukunonu.

Within each constituency, there are five separate positions; the Faipule (atoll leader) designate, the Pulenuku (village mayor) designate, the Fatupaepae (Council of Women) representative, the Taulelea/Aumaga (Men's Group) representative and three Taupulega (village elder) representatives.

Results

References

General
Tokelau
Elections in Tokelau